Diamonds and Pearls is the thirteenth studio album by American recording artist Prince, and the first with his new backing band The New Power Generation. It was released on October 1, 1991, by Paisley Park Records and Warner Bros. Records. The album produced several hit singles, including "Gett Off", "Cream", "Money Don't Matter 2 Night", "Insatiable", and the title track. Dancers Lori Werner (then dancing under the stage name of Lori Elle) and Robia LaMorte, known as "Diamond" and "Pearl" respectively, appeared on the holographic cover (re-pressings of the album are non holographic). Diamond and Pearl also appeared in the music videos for "Cream", "Strollin'", "Gett Off", and the title track, and also participated in Prince's Diamonds and Pearls Tour.

Diamonds and Pearls contains a hybrid of music styles, from the funk of "Daddy Pop", "Jughead", and first single "Gett Off", to some of the more mainstream pop/rock songs Prince had recorded in some time, such as "Cream", "Money Don't Matter 2 Night" and the title song. "Willing and Able" was used in a video montage during the closing credits of CBS' coverage of Super Bowl XXVI.

Track listing

Album evolution
One of the earliest songs that ended up on Diamonds and Pearls was "Live 4 Love", a track from 1989.  The bulk of the material would be composed in 1990, however. A few songs evolved during Prince's Nude Tour in 1990, notably "The Flow" and "Schoolyard". Prince decided to place an emphasis on rap with this album, handing the reins over to Nude Tour dancer Tony M.  An early version of the album from November 1990 consisted of the following:

 "The Flow"
 "Daddy Pop"
 "Diamonds and Pearls"
 "Cream"
 "Strollin'"
 "Willing and Able"
 "Violet the Organ Grinder"
 "Walk Don't Walk"
 "Horny Pony" - unreleased version
 "Money Don't Matter 2 Nite"
 "Something Funky (This House Comes)"
 "Schoolyard"
 "Live 4 Love"

Most of these songs went through minor to major revisions before being released, and five of them did not make the cut at all. The five songs that were omitted from the album are "The Flow", "Violet the Organ Grinder", "Horny Pony", "Something Funky (This House Comes)", and "Schoolyard". "The Flow" would be revised for the Love Symbol Album. A later version of the album had "Horny Pony" in the place of "Gett Off", a newly written track that replaced it at the last minute. In fact, "Horny Pony" still exists on the track listing, written in red over "Gett Off", and is mentioned in the lyrics to "Push".

Personnel
 Prince – lead vocals and various instruments
 Rosie Gaines – keyboards (2), co-lead vocals (3, 11), backing vocals and keyboards (4, 6, 7–9)
 Tommy Barbarella – keyboards (2–4, 6–8)
 Levi Seacer, Jr. – bass (2, 5, 6, 8–10), rhythm guitar (4, 7)
 Sonny T. – bass (3, 4, 7, 13)
 Michael B. – drums (2–8, 10, 13)
 Sheila E. – synth drum fills (3)
 Damon Dickson – percussion (6, 7, 9)
 Kirk Johnson – percussion (6, 7, 9)
 Eric Leeds – flute (7)
 Tony M. – rap (2, 6, 7, 9, 11, 13)
 Elisa Fiorillo – additional vocals (2, 8)
 Clare Fischer – sampled orchestration (11)

Production
 Arranged and produced by Prince and The New Power Generation
 Engineered by Keith "KC" Cohen, David Friedlander, Michael Koppelman, Matt Larson, Sylvia Massy, Steve Noonan, Tim Penn and Brian Poer
 Mixed by Michael Koppelman, Keith Cohen and Tom Garneau
 Mastered by Michael Koppelman
 All songs published by Controversy Music-WB Music, except "Willing & Able" (Controversy Music-WB Music-Michael Anthony Music-Mac Dog Productions), "Jughead" (Controversy Music-WB Music-Mac Dog Music-Kinky J. Music) and "Push" (Controversy Music-WB Music-Mattie Lucille Publishing).

Singles and Hot 100 chart placings
 "Gett Off" maxi-single (#21 US, #6 US R&B, #4 UK, #8 AUS)
 "Gett Off"
 "Horny Pony"

 "Cream" maxi-single (#1 US, #15 UK, #2 AUS)
 "Cream"
 "Horny Pony"

 "Insatiable" (#3 US R&B)
 "Insatiable"
 "I Love U in Me"

 "Diamonds and Pearls" maxi-single (#3 US, #1 US R&B, #25 UK, #13 AUS)
 "Diamonds and Pearls"
 "Q in Doubt"

 "Money Don't Matter 2 Night" maxi-single (#23 US, #14 US R&B, #19 UK, #18 AUS)
 "Money Don't Matter 2 Night"
 "Call the Law"
 "Push" (UK)

 "Thunder" maxi-single (#28 UK)
 "Thunder"
 "Violet the Organ Grinder"
 "Gett Off" (Thrust Dub)

Charts

Weekly charts

Year-end charts

Certifications

See also
 1991 in music
 List of Billboard number-one R&B albums of 1991

References

Further reading

External links
 Diamonds and Pearls at Discogs

1991 albums
Prince (musician) albums
Albums produced by Prince (musician)
Paisley Park Records albums
Warner Records albums
New jack swing albums
Albums recorded in a home studio
Albums recorded at Olympic Sound Studios